The 31st Filipino Academy of Movie Arts and Sciences Awards Night was held on May 28, 1983, in the Philippines .  This is for the Outstanding Achievements of the different  films for the year 1982.

VIVA Films "Gaano kadalas ang Minsan? won the most award with 6 wins but the FAMAS Award for Best Picture went to Cain and Abel.  Vilma Santos won her third FAMAS Best Actress.

Awards

Major Awards
Winners are listed first and highlighted with boldface.

Special Awardee

Hall Of Fame Awardees
Joseph Estrada - Actor
1982 - Kumander Alibasbas
1970 - Patria Adorada
1967 - Ito Ang Pilipino
1965 - Geron Busabos, Ang Batang Quiapo
1963 - Markang Rehas

Hall Of Fame Awardees
Emar Pictures/JE Productions - Producer
1982 - Kumander Alibasbas
1978 - Bakya Mo Neneng
1973 - Kill The Pushers
1967 - Ito Ang Pilipino
1965 - Geron Busabos, Ang Batang Quiapo

References

External links
FAMAS Awards 

FAMAS Award
FAMAS
FAMAS